= Thermodynamic relations across normal shocks =

"Normal shocks" are a fundamental type of shock wave. The waves, which are perpendicular to the flow, are called "normal" shocks. Normal shocks only happen when the flow is supersonic. At those speeds, no obstacle is identified before the speed of sound which makes the molecule return after sensing the obstacle. While returning, the molecule becomes coalescent at certain point. This thin film of molecules act as normal shocks.

== Thermodynamic relation across normal shocks ==
=== Mach number ===
The Mach number in the upstream is given by ${M_1}$ and the mach number in the downstream is given by ${M_2}$

${M^2_2=\frac{{\frac{2}{\gamma-1}}+M^2_1}{\frac{2\gamma}{\gamma-1}M^2_1-1}} = \frac{(\gamma-1)M^2_1+2}{2\gamma M^2_1-(\gamma-1)}.$	1

Note that the Mach numbers are given in the reference frame of the shock.

=== Static pressure ===
${\frac{P_2}{P_1}=\frac{2\gamma}{\gamma+1}M^2_1-{\frac{\gamma-1}{\gamma+1}}}$	2

=== Static temperature ===
${\frac{T_2}{T_1}=\frac{\left(1+\frac{\gamma-1}{2}M^2_1\right)\left(\frac{2\gamma}{\gamma-1}M^2_1-1\right)}{\frac{1}{2}\frac{\left(\gamma+1\right)^2}{\left(\gamma-1\right)}M^2_1}} = \frac{ \left[ 2\gamma M^2_1 - (\gamma-1) \right]\cdot \left[ (\gamma-1)M^2_1 + 2 \right] }{(\gamma+1)^2 M^2_1}$	3

=== Stagnation pressure ===
${\frac{P_{02}}{P_{01}}}=\left(\frac{\frac{\gamma+1}{2}M^2_1}{1+\frac{\gamma-1}{2}M^2_1}\right)^\frac{\gamma}{\left(\gamma-1\right)}\left(\frac{2\gamma}{\gamma+1}M^2_1-\frac{\gamma-1}{\gamma+1}\right)^\frac{-1}{\left(\gamma-1\right)} = \left[ \frac{(\gamma+1)M^2_1}{(\gamma-1)M^2_1 + 2} \right]^{\frac{\gamma}{\gamma-1}} \cdot \left[ \frac{\gamma+1}{2\gamma M^2_1 - (\gamma-1)} \right]^{\frac{1}{\gamma-1}}$	4

=== Entropy change ===
${\frac{\Delta S}{R}=\frac{\gamma}{\gamma-1}\ln\left(\frac{2}{\left(\gamma+1\right)M^2_1}+\frac{\gamma-1}{\gamma+1}\right)+\frac{1}{\gamma-1}\ln\left(\frac{2\gamma}{\gamma+1}M^2_1-\frac{\gamma-1}{\gamma+1}\right)}$	5

== Reference list ==
- Yaha, S.M (2010). Fundamentals of compressible flow (4th ed.). New age international publishers. ISBN 9788122426687.
